Rugby Club Nîmes Gard (also known as just RC Nîmes) are a French rugby union club that currently compete in the Fédérale 2 competition, the third division of French rugby. They have in the past played in the higher divisions, and in 1991 were quarter-finalists of the top French championship. Nîmes were established in 1963 and play in red and green colours. The driving force behind the club has always been former Béziers captain Louis Gagnière, who as president took the club to the top division in the late eighties and early nineties. After a long battle with illness he has returned to the club and they are becoming strong contenders for the top level once again.

Honors
 French championship:
 Quarter-finalists: 1991

Current squad

Notable former players

 Marc Andrieu
 Didier Camberabero
   Hervé Chabowski
   Hervé Giraud
   Bernard Viviès
   Jean-Claude Langlade
   Sébastien Bruno
   Thierry Devergie
   Pierre-Édouard Detrez

All of these players have represented France at full international level in the recent past, although Camberabero (Béziers) and Bruno (Sale) and Viviès (Agen) were at other clubs when they became internationals.

 Christophe Barrière
 Jérôme Bianchi
 Éric Tissot

Have represented France 'A'.

 Thierry Teixeira
Have represented Portugal

See also
 List of rugby union clubs in France

External links
 Official website

Nimes
Sport in Nîmes
Rugby clubs established in 1963
1963 establishments in France